Johann Hottinger may refer to:

 Johann Heinrich Hottinger (1620–1667), Swiss philologist and theologian
 Johann Jakob Hottinger (1652–1735), Swiss theologian
 Johann Jakob Hottinger (historian) (1783–1860), Swiss historian